Gilbert Edward Wardley (23 April 1895 – 19 February 1971) was an Australian rules footballer who played with Essendon in the Victorian Football League (VFL).

Family
The son of Edward Wardley (1859-1926), and Jane Hutton Logan Wardley (1863-1932), née Clouston, Gilbert Edward Wardley was born at  Rutherglen, Victoria on 23 April 1895.

Death
He died at Lambton, New South Wales on 19 February 1971.

Footnotes

References 
 
 Maplestone, M., Flying Higher: History of the Essendon Football Club 1872–1996, Essendon Football Club, (Melbourne), 1996.

External links 

1895 births
1971 deaths
Australian rules footballers from Victoria (Australia)
Essendon Football Club players